Ho Chia-hsin (born 1 November 1997) is a Taiwanese taekwondo practitioner. In 2018, he won one of the bronze medals in the men's −63 kg event at the 2018 Asian Games held in Jakarta, Indonesia.

He competed in the men's bantamweight event at the 2017 World Taekwondo Championships held in Muju County, South Korea. A few months later, he won one of the bronze medals in the men's −63 kg event at the 2017 Asian Indoor and Martial Arts Games held in Ashgabat, Turkmenistan.

In 2019, he competed in the men's bantamweight event at the 2019 World Taekwondo Championships in Manchester, United Kingdom. He was eliminated in his third match by Jaouad Achab of Belgium. In the same year, he won one of the bronze medals in the men's Team Kyorugi event at the 2019 Summer Universiade held in Naples, Italy.

References

External links 
 

Living people
1997 births
Place of birth missing (living people)
Taiwanese male taekwondo practitioners
Taekwondo practitioners at the 2018 Asian Games
Medalists at the 2018 Asian Games
Asian Games bronze medalists for Chinese Taipei
Asian Games medalists in taekwondo
Universiade medalists in taekwondo
Universiade silver medalists for Chinese Taipei
Universiade bronze medalists for Chinese Taipei
Medalists at the 2017 Summer Universiade
Medalists at the 2019 Summer Universiade
21st-century Taiwanese people